Fat choy (Nostoc flagelliforme) is a terrestrial cyanobacterium (a type of photosynthetic bacteria) that is used as a vegetable in Chinese cuisine.  When dried, the product has the appearance of black hair. For that reason, its name in Chinese means "hair vegetable". When soaked, fat choy has a soft texture which is like very fine vermicelli.

Production
Fat choy grows on the ground in the Gobi Desert and the Qinghai Plateau.  Over-harvesting on the Mongolian steppes has furthered erosion and desertification in those areas. The Chinese government has limited its harvesting, which has caused its price to increase. This may be one reason why some commercially available fat choy has been found to be adulterated with strands of a non-cellular starchy material, with other additives and dyes. Real fat choy is dark green in color, while the counterfeit fat choy appears black.

Chinese culture
Its name in Cantonese sound the same as a Cantonese phrase meaning "struck it rich" (though the second syllable, coi, has a different tone) -- this is found, for example, in the Cantonese saying, "Gung1 hei2 faat3 coi4" (恭喜發財, meaning "wishing you prosperity"), often proclaimed during Chinese New Year. Therefore, it is a popular ingredient for the Chinese New Year, like in the reunion dinner. It is enjoyed as an alternative to cellophane noodles.  It is mostly used in Cantonese cuisine and Buddhist cuisine. It is sometimes used as a hot pot ingredient.

Vietnamese culture
Fat choy is also used in Vietnamese cuisine.

Health effects
N. flagelliforme has no nutritional value, and also contains beta-N-methylamino-L-alanine (BMAA), a toxic amino acid that could affect the normal functions of nerve cells and is linked to degenerative diseases such as ALS, Alzheimer's, Parkinson's, and dementia. 

Across a 28-day duration,  laboratory rats fed N. flagelliforme and the control group did not exhibit significant differences in any toxicological parameters.

The algae and its extracts reduce the inflammatory action of white blood cells, specifically macrophages and splenocytes, in vitro.

Notes and references

Bibliography

External links 

Vegetables
Chinese New Year foods
Nostocaceae